The Comiq (stylized in all caps) is a Japanese manga series written and illustrated by Kazuki Takahashi. It was serialized in Shueisha's shōnen manga magazine Weekly Shōnen Jump from October to November 2018, with its chapters collected in a single tankōbon volume.

Publication
Written and illustrated by Kazuki Takahashi, The Comiq was serialized in Shueisha's shōnen manga magazine Weekly Shōnen Jump from October 15 to November 26, 2018. Shueisha collected its seven chapters in a single tankōbon volume, released on January 4, 2019.

In North America, the manga was licensed by Viz Media and published on their Weekly Shonen Jump digital magazine. Viz Media published the volume digitally on June 28, 2022.

References

External links
  
 

Mystery anime and manga
Shōnen manga
Shueisha manga
Thriller anime and manga
Viz Media manga